
Gmina Janowo is a rural gmina (administrative district) in Nidzica County, Warmian-Masurian Voivodeship, in northern Poland.

Villages
Gmina Janowo contains the villages and settlements of Grabówko, Grabowo, Jagarzewo, Janowo, Komorowo, Łomno, Muszaki, Puchałowo, Rembowo, Róg, Ruskowo, Ryki-Borkowo, Szczepkowo-Giewarty, Szemplino Czarne, Szemplino Wielkie, Ulesie, Uścianek, Wichrowiec, Więckowo, Zachy, Zawady, Zdrojek and Zembrzus-Mokry Grunt.

Neighbouring gminas
Gmina Janowo is bordered by the gminas of Chorzele, Dzierzgowo, Janowiec Kościelny, Jedwabno, Nidzica and Wielbark.

References
Polish official population figures 2006

Janowo
Nidzica County